Bamiania is a genus of flowering plant belonging to the family Plumbaginaceae.

Its native range is Afghanistan.

Species:

Bamiania pachycorma

References

Plumbaginaceae
Caryophyllales genera